Holly Grove School District No. 7 was a school district headquartered in Holly Grove, Arkansas.

By 2004 new laws were passed requiring school districts with enrollments below 350 to consolidate with other school districts. Holly Grove was one of several districts that were unable to find another district willing to consolidate with it, so the Arkansas Board of Education was to forcibly consolidate it. On July 1, 2004, the Holly Grove School District was merged into the Clarendon School District.

References

Further reading
 Map of Arkansas School Districts pre-July 1, 2004

External links
 
 Holly Grove School District No. 7  Monroe County, Arkansas   General Purpose Financial Statements  and Other Reports June 30, 2000 
 Holly Grove School District No. 7 Monroe County, Arkansas General Purpose Financial Statements and Other Reports June 30, 2002 
 Holly Grove School District No. 7  Monroe County, Arkansas General Purpose Financial Statements and Other Reports June 30, 2003 

Education in Monroe County, Arkansas
Defunct school districts in Arkansas
2004 disestablishments in Arkansas
School districts disestablished in 2004